Turka (Türkhene) is a rural locality (a selo) in Pribaykalsky District, Republic of Buryatia, Russia. The population was 1,450 as of 2010. There are 19 streets.

Geography
Goryachinsk is the nearest rural locality.

References 

Populated places on Lake Baikal